The Aruban records in swimming are the fastest ever performances of swimmers from Aruba, which are recognised and ratified by the Aruba Aquatics Federation (AAF).

All records were set in finals unless noted otherwise.

Long Course (50 m)

Men

Women

Mixed relay

Short Course (25 m)

Men

Women

Notes

References
General
Aruban Long Course records 19 December 2020 updated
Aruban Short Course records 10 January 2018 updated
Specific

External links
AAF website

Aruba
Records
Swimming
Swimming